Match of the Day was a program that aired on the now defunct NBCSN. The show, based on the BBC version also titled Match of the Day, featured highlights of the day's Premier League action most Saturdays.  A sister program, Match of the Day II, which also bears the same name as its BBC counterpart, highlighted the Sunday fixtures. The show was hosted by Rebecca Lowe and featured analysis by Robbie Earle, Robbie Mustoe and Kyle Martino, as well as contributions by the UK counterpart's respective host and commentator Gary Lineker and Steve Bower, and Neil Ashton.

References

NBCSN shows
2013 American television series debuts
American sports television series
Soccer on United States television
Premier League on television